The Rio Branco Institute (Abbreviation: IRBr) is a graduate school of International Relations and diplomatic academy located in Brasília, Brazil. The institute was created on April 18, 1945, as part of the centennial celebration of the birth of the Baron of Rio Branco. The IRBr is run by the Ministry of External Relations of Brazil.

Graduation from the IRBr is the only possible entrance point into the diplomatic career in Brazil.

Courses

The Rio Branco Institute offers a career program and two advancement courses.

Graduate course
The IRBr's Graduation and Improvement Program is a one-year-and-a-half program of studies, encompassing studies in fields such as History, Economics, Politics, Law, Foreign Policy, English, French, Spanish, Chinese, Russian and Arabic. After successful completion of the course, students are confirmed in the Foreign Service as Third-Secretaries.

Admission

Entry
Admission to IRBr is achieved through a five-phase entrance examination:
First phase: pre-selection exam
Second phase: written exam on Portuguese
Third phase: written exams on Brazilian History, Geography, Law, Economics, International Politics and English
Fourth phase: written exams on Spanish and French 
Fifth phase: Application into the Graduation and Improvement Program and submission of documents required by law

Requirements
The Ministry of External Relations established the following prerequisites for admission:
Possess Brazilian citizenship by birth;
Possess an undergraduate degree recognized by the Ministry of Education of Brazil;
Be up-to-date with military and electoral obligations; and
Possess a clean criminal record

References

External links
Instituto Rio Branco Official website 

Schools of international relations
Foreign relations of Brazil
Educational institutions established in 1945
1945 establishments in Brazil
Postgraduate schools in Brazil